The Democratic Movement of Serbia or DEPOS (DE - from Serbian "Demokratija" - Democracy, PO - from Serbian "Pokret" - Movement and S derived from "Serbia"), was a big tent political coalition founded in 1992, led by centre-right Serbian Renewal Movement of Vuk Drašković.

History 

DEPOS was founded by SPO on 23 May 1992. Democratic Party led by Dragoljub Mićunović, refused to join coalition, due to right-wing policies of SPO. Group of members left DS in July 1992 and founded Democratic Party of Serbia, with Vojislav Koštunica as president. DSS joined DEPOS shortly after.

1992 election 
Organized by DEPOS, the Vidovdan Council was held on the plateau in front of the Federal Assembly from June 28 to July 5, 1992, demanding the resignation of Milošević, the dissolution of the Serbian Parliament and the formation of the so-called government of national salvation. Tens of thousands of citizens were addressed by a large number of prominent personalities, among whom were the Serbian patriarch Pavle, the heir to the throne Aleksandar Karađorđević and the writer Matija Bećković. The Vidovdan Council ended in an atmosphere of disappointment because the government did not agree to the demands of DEPOS, but only to the holding of non-binding round tables of the government and the opposition, at which the election legislation would be discussed. The focus was on the electoral system - the government advocated remaining a majority, while the opposition demanded proportionality. The federal government, headed by Milan Panić, an American businessman of Serbian descent, in July 1992, also supported the opposition's proposal that the elections be conducted according to the proportional system, which was eventually adopted. Panić became presidential candidate supported by DEPOS during 1992 Serbian presidential election. The Democratic Movement of Serbia tried to present itself to voters as an alternative to the government, basing the campaign on black and white contrast, symbolizing the difference between the Milošević regime and what the opposition advocated.

1993 election 
By turning to the civic option in late 1993, DEPOS was left without the Democratic Party of Serbia, which was trying to fill the vacant space in the center-right position. However, Civic Alliance of Serbia and Peasants Party of Serbia joined the coalition. The Democratic Movement of Serbia, weakened by the withdrawal of the DSS from the coalition, achieved a slightly worse result compared to the previous elections. DEPOS slipped from almost 800,000 votes to 715,000, winning 45 seats, five less than in 1992. The reasons for that should be sought primarily in the independent performance of the DSS, which, by winning 218,000 votes, certainly dragged a part of the voters to DEPOS. However, the electoral system did not go hand in hand with Vojislav Koštunica's party, whose votes were unevenly distributed among constituencies, so with just over five percent of the vote at the Republic's level, it won only seven seats (2.8 percent).

The coalition received 16.89% of the popular vote in the 1992 and 16.64% in the 1993 parliamentary elections. The coalition was dissolved in 1994 after New Democracy entered into a coalition government with the Socialist Party.

Members

Electoral results

Parliamentary elections

Presidential election 

 Independent candidate, support

See also
Democratic Opposition of Serbia

References

External links

1992 establishments in Serbia
1993 disestablishments in Yugoslavia
Defunct political party alliances in Serbia
Democracy movements
Political opposition organizations
Political parties disestablished in 1993
Political parties established in 1992